Ryan Vojtesak, also known as Charlie Handsome, is a multi-platinum selling record producer and songwriter born in Atlanta, Georgia. Handsome has worked with artists such as Post Malone, Khalid, Drake, Kanye West, Travis Scott, The Weeknd, Young Thug, Juice WRLD, Chance the Rapper, Kodak Black, Sam Hunt, Morgan Wallen and many more.

Early life and career 
Charlie Handsome began playing the guitar and writing songs at age 14. He dropped out of high school and wrote songs as a hobby while pursuing a career in construction. In 2014, after meeting with G.O.O.D Music President Che Pope, Handsome decided to move to Los Angeles to pursue music a full time career in music, with Handsome citing G.O.O.D Music founder Kanye West as a significant early inspiration. Later that year, Handsome met and began working with Post Malone, earning an executive producer credit on Malone’s 5x Platinum Certified debut album Stoney. By 2019 Handsome had produced several records featured on the Billboard Hot 100 for artists including Khalid, Kodak Black, Young Thug, Chris Brown and Drake, and was featured as a Variety Hitmaker for the year. By 2020, Charlie was highlighted at the 20th Anniversary of the BMI R&B and Hip Hop Awards for having 5 or more credits on the Billboard Hot 100 in the year alongside producers including Nick Mira, Tay Keith, London On Da Track and Mike Dean, and was also named one of the 'best hip-hop producers of the year' by XXL Magazine. In addition to his work in Hip-Hop and R&B, Handsome also works extensively country music producing for artists including Sam Hunt, Kane Brown, Florida Georgia Line and Morgan Wallen, having produced on Wallen's 2x Platinum selling Dangerous: The Double Album. In 2022, Handsome notably co-produced the Billboard Hot 100 #1 record "First Class" and 5 other tracks on rapper Jack Harlow's second studio album "Come Home the Kids Miss You," and co-produced Morgan Wallen's "You Proof," which peaked at #1 on the Billboard Hot Country Songs chart.

Awards and accolades 
In 2019, Handsome was recognized as a "Hitmaker" by Variety, for his work on Khalid's "Better," and won a BMI Pop Award for his work on Khalid and Normani's "Love Lies". In 2020, Handsome was once again recognized by Variety as a "Hitmaker," this time for his work on Trevor Daniel's viral hit record "Falling" alongside producers KC Supreme and Taz Taylor. Handsome thereafter won another BMI Pop Award in 2020 for contributions on Khalid's "Better," and was recognized for this standout year by Music Row Magazine as #22 on their Top 100 Songwriter Charts. In 2021, Handsome was once again presented a BMI Pop award for his work on Trevor Daniel's "Falling," Later in 2021, the NMPA recognized Handsome's contributions on Kane Brown's "Be Like That Ft. Khalid & Swae Lee" as the year's Platinum Anthem; the most listened to song from July 1, 2020 – June 30, 2021. Furthermore, 2021 also saw XXL Magazine recognize Young Thug's Punk as one of the best albums of the year, which heavily featured Handsome's production on 4 tracks on the album. By the end of the year, Handsome was once again recognized as a Music Row Top 100 Songwriter, this time landing at #48 on the list.

In 2022, Handsome won Country Music Award's Album of The Year for his contributions on Morgan Wallen's "Dangeous: The Double Album. In that same year, he won a BMI Pop Award for his contributions on Kane Brown's "Be Like That," and in September Handsome was named as a "Top Producer of the Year" at the BMI R&B & Hip Hop Awards alongside producers such as Kanye West and Roget Chahyed among others.

Discography

References

Year of birth missing (living people)
Living people